Parminder Kaur Nagra (born 5 October 1975) is a British actress of Indian Punjabi descent and Sikh heritage. She is known for portraying Jess Bhamra in the film Bend It Like Beckham (2002) and Dr. Neela Rasgotra in the NBC medical drama series ER from 2003 to 2009. She has had several other major television roles, including a starring role as Meera Malik in the NBC crime drama series The Blacklist for season one and a recurring role on the ABC/Marvel Television series Agents of S.H.I.E.L.D. as Ellen Nadeer for season four.

Early life
Nagra was born on 5 October 1975 in Leicester, England, to Sukha and Nashuter Nagra, Sikh factory workers who emigrated from the Punjab region of India in the 1960s. She is the eldest of four children with two brothers and one sister. Nagra attended the Northfield House Primary School in Leicester. At her comprehensive school, Soar Valley College, she played the viola in the youth orchestra and also appeared in her first theatrical productions.

A few months after sitting her A-levels and leaving school, Nagra was approached by Jez Simons, her former drama instructor, about becoming part of the Leicester-based theatre company Haithizi Productions, for which he served as the artistic director. She accepted and was cast as a chorus member in the 1994 musical Nimai presented at the Haymarket Theatre. Only a week into rehearsals, she was switched from the chorus to replace the lead actress, who had dropped out. Simons recalls that Nagra, a good singer and actress, also had a quality that raised her above other actresses which led him to select her as the new lead, despite the inconvenience of performing with her arm in a cast.

Career

1990s to early 2000s
Nagra left Leicester for London and decided not to go to university. Instead she pursued a theatrical career and her childhood ambition of becoming an actress. Nagra's first London theatrical job came in 1994, when she was cast as the Princess in the pantomime Sleeping Beauty at the Theatre Royal Stratford East. After Sleeping Beauty, Nagra worked with small Indian theatre companies such as Tara Arts and Tamasha. These roles eventually led to its radio and television appearances that defined her career throughout most of the 1990s. She also appeared in "The 6th Wonder of the World: The Kali Tutti Story", in 1994. In 1996, Nagra took a small part in Chikamatsu Monzaemon's Fair Ladies at a Game of Poem Cards that was performed at Cottesloe, Royal National Theatre.

Despite lacking formal theatrical training, Nagra signed with Joan Brown, a veteran London-based agent, after which she was cast in minor television roles in the British medical drama series Casualty, and in the television film King Girl, in which she played an abusive member of an all-girl gang. In 1997, Nagra appeared in the three-part drama Turning World alongside Roshan Seth. The following year, she appeared on Casualty again. In 1999, she played a convenience store clerk in the television film Donovan Quick, opposite Colin Firth. Also of note were appearances on the British comedy Goodness Gracious Me. Nagra also co-starred in radio plays including, among others, plays by Tanika Gupta. In 1998, Nagra co-starred in the radio play Dancing Girls of Lahore which was co-written by her future Bend It Like Beckham co-star Shaheen Khan.

Nagra's other notable stage roles during this period include:

 Skeleton (1997), with critical acclaim for her "bright-eyed vivacity" as the village girl
 A Tainted Dawn (1997) where she played a Hindu boy accidentally left in Pakistan and brought up by a Muslim couple
 Fourteen Songs, Two Weddings & A Funeral (1998) where she showed her skills as a romantic comedian, also to critical acclaim
 Krishna's Lila—A Play of the Asian World (1999) where she was part of a five-person cast in a controversially titled piece
 The Square Circle (1999) in the demanding role of an illiterate peasant girl who becomes a rape victim
 River on Fire (2000), as Kiran, in a retelling of Sophocles' Antigone

In 2001, Nagra voiced a Muslim girl in the docu-drama Arena: The Veil about women who choose to wear the Muslim head scarf. In 1997, not long after Fair Ladies at a Game of Poem Cards, Nagra was cast in Oh Sweet Sita, an adaptation of Indian mythology about Rama and his wife Sita, in the title role of Sita. During that time, Nagra caught the attention of director Gurinder Chadha.

Bend It Like Beckham
Nagra played the lead role in Gurinder Chadha's 2002 comedy-drama Bend It Like Beckham, which became her breakthrough film, alongside Jonathan Rhys Meyers, Anupam Kher, Shaheen Khan, and Keira Knightley, for whom this film also became a career breakthrough. It was directed by Chadha. Nagra played Jesminder "Jess" Bhamra, a teenage Sikh football player who idolises football superstar David Beckham and defies her traditional parents to pursue her dreams of playing football. The small-budget film was a critical and financial success in the United Kingdom, eventually making the leap around the world and to Canada and the United States where it earned over $30 million at the box office. The script was written by Chadha with her husband Paul Mayeda Berges and Guljit Bindra with Nagra in mind. While initially indifferent to the game of football, Nagra found the football-centred story to be both funny and touching. She agreed to audition and eventually accepted the role. An intensive ten-week training course in the game Futebol de Salao, coached by Simon Clifford, put Nagra through rigorous nine-hour-a-day workouts. Nagra learned to "bend" or curve the ball in flight, as she did in a scene in the film. Acknowledging Nagra's actual burn-scarred leg, Chadha wrote it into the film.

Nagra received critical and professional acclaim for her performance. She was nominated, and won, several awards, including the FIFA Presidential Award (2002), making her the first woman to have done so.

2004–present
Not long after filming ended on Bend It Like Beckham, Nagra co-starred in the fantasy romantic comedy Ella Enchanted alongside Anne Hathaway where she played Areida, the best friend of Hathaway’s's title character. In addition, she took on two notable television roles for Channel 4—as Viola/Cesario in a multicultural version of William Shakespeare's Twelfth Night, and as Heere Sharma in the two-part Anglo-Indian drama Second Generation, loosely based on Shakespeare's King Lear, directed by Jon Sen and starring Om Puri. Although Second Generation was a ratings flop, it was a critical success, earning a place in The Observer newspaper's top 10 British TV programmes of 2003. It garnered Nagra an Ethnic Multicultural Media Academy (EMMA) Award. For the role, Nagra had to gain the courage to do some of the love scenes that she had vowed not to do as an actress. Her visit to Calcutta to film the final scenes set there was Nagra's first visit to India.

While on a promotional junket in Los Angeles for Bend It Like Beckham, Nagra was informed by her agent that John Wells, one of the producers of the NBC medical drama series ER, was interested in meeting her. Bend It Like Beckham writer and director Gurinder Chadha revealed during a 2007 episode of BBC's Movie Connections that she arranged the meeting, because she had recommended Nagra for the role of the new Indian character in ER during a conversation with her friend Wells. Not long after the meeting, Nagra signed a one-year contract that included an option for three additional years. Despite her new status, Nagra said, "I don't think Hollywood has changed me at all. The first thing I did when I arrived was buy chapati flour and lentils."

Nagra made her first appearance on ER on 25 September 2003, in the tenth-season premiere titled "Now What?" as Neela Rasgotra, a new Yale-educated Anglo-Indian medical student at County General Hospital. Wells adapted the role to suit Nagra, so she could use her own English accent while working. Nagra appeared in twenty-one of the season's twenty-two episodes, including the twelfth episode titled "NICU" and the seventeenth episode titled "The Student", episodes in which her character played a central role. Noah Wyle, announcing his departure from the series in 2004, described Nagra as "the future" of ER, and the media concurred, anointing her as one of the show's "golden girls". In October 2008, following the departures of Goran Visnjic, Maura Tierney, and Mekhi Phifer, Nagra became the longest-serving cast member and lead actor of ER and remained so until the series concluded with season 15: episode 22, the two-hour series finale titled "And in the End..." which aired on 2 April 2009.

When Nagra finished filming the eleventh season of ER in 2005, she returned to her native Leicester to star in Love in Little India directed by Amit Gupta. She was nominated in 2006 for an Asian Excellence Award, in the category of Outstanding Female Television Performance, for her work in ER, and won the award the following year. Nagra was awarded the Honorary Degree of Doctors of Letters by the University of Leicester on 11 July 2007. In 2008, Nagra voiced Cassandra in the DC animated film Batman: Gotham Knight. Later, she co-starred as Dr Lucy Banerjee in the Fox science fiction drama series Alcatraz which ran for one season from 16 January to 26 March 2012. Nagra starred as CIA agent Meera Malik in the first season of the NBC crime drama series The Blacklist from 2013 to 2014. In 2016, Nagra joined the second season of British arctic psychological thriller Fortitude. In 2018, Nagra joined the second season of the Netflix web television series 13 Reasons Why as Priya Singh, the new counsellor of Liberty High.

Personal life
While on the set of the Fair Ladies at a Game of Poem Cards, Nagra met Irish actor Kieran Creggan with whom she later moved into a flat in Kennington, South London. They were in a relationship for five years.

On 17 January 2009, after a seven-year relationship, Nagra married photographer James Stenson. Her ER co-stars Scott Grimes and John Stamos performed at the ceremony, and her friend and former ER co-star Maura Tierney officiated. On 19 May 2009, she gave birth to their son Kai David Singh Stenson. On 8 February 2012, it was reported that Nagra had filed for divorce. The divorce was finalised in July 2013.

Nagra was one of the bearers of the Olympic torch as it passed through London on its way to the 2004 Summer Olympics in Athens, Greece.

Filmography

Film

Television

Awards

References

External links

 
 Parminder Nagra Fan Club (fansite)

1975 births
Living people
20th-century British actresses
21st-century British actresses
Actresses from Leicestershire
British actresses of Indian descent
British expatriate actresses in the United States
British film actresses
British people of Punjabi descent
British television actresses
British voice actresses
People from Leicester